Jordan Calum Goddard (born 9 September 1993) is an English footballer who plays for  side Bromsgrove Sporting, where he plays as a midfielder.

Playing career

Bristol Rovers
Although still an apprentice and an under-18 squad member, he made his debut for the Bristol Rovers first team on 12 November 2011 in an FA Cup first round match against Corby Town. After the game, he was investigated by Avon and Somerset Police for allegedly urinating in front of Corby fans as he warmed-up for the match.

He began a two-year scholarship with Bristol Rovers, studying at St. Brendan's Sixth Form College, in September 2010.

Gloucester City
On 2 October 2011 he joined Gloucester City on loan, along with teammate Mitch Harding. He scored his first goal on his debut for the club on 2 October 2012, in a 5–1 win at home against Bishop's Stortford.

Leamington
On 18 July 2014 Jordan joined Leamington and made his non competitive debut scoring in a preseason friendly against Cheltenham Town.

Bromsgrove Sporting
On 18 December 2021, Goddard signed for Southern League Premier Central side Bromsgrove Sporting.

Bromsgrove Sporting confirmed on 17 June 2022, that Goddard, along with team mate Dominic Perkins had both agreed deals to stay with the club for the 2022–23 season.

References

External links

Jordan Goddard at Aylesbury United

1993 births
Living people
English footballers
Association football midfielders
Bristol Rovers F.C. players
Gloucester City A.F.C. players
AFC Telford United players
Sutton Coldfield Town F.C. players
Leamington F.C. players
Halesowen Town F.C. players
Alvechurch F.C. players
Nuneaton Borough F.C. players
Bromsgrove Sporting F.C. players
English Football League players
National League (English football) players
Southern Football League players
Northern Premier League players